Harpalus tridens is a species of ground beetle in the subfamily Harpalinae. It was described by A.Morawitz in 1862.

References

tridens
Beetles described in 1862